High-end audio is a class of consumer home audio equipment marketed to audiophiles on the basis of high price or quality, and esoteric or novel sound reproduction technologies. The term can refer simply to the price, to the build quality of the components, or to the subjective or objective quality of sound reproduction.

Definition 
The distinction between the terms high end and high fidelity is not well defined. According to one industry commentator, high-end could be defined as, "Gear below which's price and performance one could not go without compromising the music and the sound." Harry Pearson, founder of The Absolute Sound magazine, is widely acknowledged to have coined the term high-end audio.

Costs 
High-end audio equipment can be extremely expensive. It is sometimes referred to as cost-no-object equipment. Audiophile equipment can encompass the full range from budget to high-end in terms of price.

Fidelity assessment 
The fidelity of sound reproduction may be assessed aurally or using audio system measurements.

The human sense of hearing is subjective and difficult to define. Psychoacoustics is a division of acoustics that studies this field.

Measurements can be deceiving; high or low figures of certain technical characteristics do not necessarily offer a good representation of how the equipment sounds to each person. For example, some valve amplifiers produce greater amounts of total harmonic distortion, but this type of distortion (2nd harmonic) is not as disturbing to the ear as the higher-order distortions produced by poorly designed transistor equipment.

The validity of certain products is often questioned. These include accessories such as speaker wires utilizing exotic materials (such as oxygen-free copper) and construction geometries, cable stands for lifting them off the floor (as a way to control mechanically induced vibrations), connectors, sprays and other tweaks.

See also 
 Audio noise measurement
 Broadcast quality
 Professional audio
 Stereophile, The Absolute Sound; high-end home audio magazines

References 

Audio players
Consumer electronics